The enzyme [acyl-carrier-protein] phosphodiesterase (EC 3.1.4.14) catalyzes the reaction

holo-[acyl-carrier-protein] + HO  4′-phosphopantetheine + apo-[acyl-carrier-protein]

This enzyme belongs to the family of hydrolases, specifically those acting on phosphoric diester bonds.  The systematic name is holo-[acyl-carrier-protein] 4′-pantetheine-phosphohydrolase. Other names in common use include ACP hydrolyase, ACP phosphodiesterase, AcpH, and [acyl-carrier-protein] 4′-pantetheine-phosphohydrolase.  This enzyme participates in pantothenate and CoA biosynthesis.

Structural studies

References

 
 
 

EC 3.1.4
Enzymes of known structure